Jeanette Ottesen (born 30 December 1987) is a Danish competitive swimmer who participated at the 2004, 2008, 2012, 2016 and 2020 Summer Olympics. In total she has won 50 international medals.

Records
She currently holds the Danish record in the following:

Long course (50 m pool): 50 m butterfly, 100 m butterfly

Short course (25 m pool): 50 m butterfly, 100 m butterfly, 50 m freestyle, 100 m freestyle

Career

Ottesen's won her first international title at the 2008 European Short Course Swimming Championships in Rijeka, Croatia in the 100 m butterfly. She has won two individual long course world titles; in 100 m freestyle in 2011 (shared with Aleksandra Gerasimenya from Belarus, and in the 50 m butterfly in 2013.

In June 2015, two months before the 2015 World Aquatics Championships in Kazan, Russia, Ottesen and her boyfriend Marco Loughran were attacked in a road rage incident in Copenhagen, during which she broke her finger. She recovered in time and won two silver medals at the world championships.

At the 2016 Summer Olympics in Rio de Janeiro, she won a bronze medal as a part of the 4 × 100 m medley relay alongside Rikke Møller Pedersen, Mie Ø. Nielsen and Pernille Blume. Here they also broke the European record with a time of 3:55.01.

In 2020, Ottesen was part of the NY Breakers in the International Swimming League.

She swims in the swimming club Kvik Kastrup and mainly concentrates on the short distances in freestyle and butterfly.

Personal life
On 13 August 2011 she married Bobby William Gray, whom she had been dating for 8 years. The couple separated in 2013 and got divorced in 2014.

In February 2017 she got engaged to British swimmer Marco Loughran, whom she has been dating since 2014. On 30 June 2017 she announced, via her blog, that they are expecting their first child. The couple wed in a surprise ceremony, in Copenhagen, on 16 July 2017.

See also 
 Danish records in swimming

References

1987 births
Living people
Danish female freestyle swimmers
Danish female butterfly swimmers
Olympic swimmers of Denmark
Swimmers at the 2004 Summer Olympics
Swimmers at the 2008 Summer Olympics
Swimmers at the 2012 Summer Olympics
Swimmers at the 2016 Summer Olympics
World Aquatics Championships medalists in swimming
Medalists at the FINA World Swimming Championships (25 m)
European Aquatics Championships medalists in swimming
World record holders in swimming
Olympic bronze medalists for Denmark
Olympic bronze medalists in swimming
Medalists at the 2016 Summer Olympics
People from Kongens Lyngby
Swimmers at the 2020 Summer Olympics
Sportspeople from the Capital Region of Denmark